Songs to Fan the Flames of Discontent is the second full-length album by Swedish hardcore punk band Refused. It was released in 1996 through Victory Records, Startrec and We Bite on CD, tape and 12" vinyl; and reissued by Burning Heart Records and Victory in 1997. A remastered version of the album was released in 2004.

The album is the band's first where Dennis Lyxzén uses screamed vocals as opposed to the shouting vocals he used on the debut This Just Might Be... the Truth and features several metal influences. The techniques, motives and musical ideas found on this album in their rudimentary form developed into what was heard on their next album, The Shape of Punk to Come. The name of the album is taken from an early edition of the Little Red Songbook published by a committee of Spokane, Washington locals of the Industrial Workers of the World in 1909, which included songs by Sweden-born IWW activist Joe Hill.

Track listing

Personnel 
Refused
Dennis Lyxzén – vocals
Kristofer Steen – guitar, bass guitar
Jon Brännström – guitar
David Sandström – drums
Magnus Björklund – bass guitar

Production
Eskil Lövström – recording, intro on "Rather Be Dead"
Pelle Henricsson – recording
Pelle Gunnerfeldt – production
D. Erixon – Cover Graphics
Eilert Andersson – Band photo
Published by Startrec Music/Songs and Stories Publishing

References 

1996 albums
Refused albums
Victory Records albums
Burning Heart Records albums